Maenam Wildlife Sanctuary is a wildlife reserve located in Ravangla, near Namchi City in the Namchi district of the Indian state of Sikkim covering an area of around . The literal meaning of maenam-la is "treasure-house of medicines", and the flora of the sanctuary is rich in a number of plants of medicinal value.

Skywalk 
The first wildlife skywalk in India will be constructed at Maenam Wildlife Sanctuary. The state government of Sikkim proposed construction of the  rope-way from Maenam Wildlife Sanctuary to a skywalk which will be built over the edge of the Bhalleydhunga steep face. There will be a rain shelter and public conveniences at the skywalk. The environment ministry has also approved the proposal, which will cost 5 billion Rupees.

See also
Wildlife sanctuaries of India

References

Wildlife sanctuaries in Sikkim
Namchi district
Protected areas established in 1987
1987 establishments in Sikkim